The Konti barb (Osteochilichthys thomassi) is a species of cyprinid fish endemic to the Western Ghats, India. It inhabits large streams.

References

Cyprinid fish of Asia
Freshwater fish of India
Endemic fauna of the Western Ghats
Fish described in 1877
Osteochilichthys